Swimming at the 2015 Games of the Small States of Europe was held from 2–5 June 2015 at Laugardalslaug Aquatic Center, Reykjavík.

Medal summary

Medal table

Men

Women

Men's results

100 m freestyle

Women's results

100 m freestyle

References

External links
Site of the 2015 Games of the Small States of Europe

2015 Games of the Small States of Europe
2015
Games of the Small States of Europe